Mamie Manckay N’ghemi (born 19 September 1995), known as Mamie Manckay and also as Zykky Manckay, is a DR Congolese footballer who plays as a defender for TP Mazembe and the DR Congo women's national team.

Club career
Manckay has played for Progresso do Sambizanga in Angola.

International career
Manckay capped for the DR Congo at senior level during the 2020 CAF Women's Olympic Qualifying Tournament (third round).

See also
 List of Democratic Republic of the Congo women's international footballers

References

External links

1995 births
Living people
Democratic Republic of the Congo women's footballers
Women's association football defenders
Progresso Associação do Sambizanga players
TP Mazembe players
Democratic Republic of the Congo women's international footballers
Democratic Republic of the Congo expatriate footballers
Democratic Republic of the Congo expatriate sportspeople in Angola
Expatriate women's footballers in Angola
21st-century Democratic Republic of the Congo people